The Burkes are an Irish family from Castlebar, County Mayo, known for their conservative religious activism and involvement in high-profile legal cases and protests in Ireland. The family are fundamentalist evangelical Christians, and consists of parents Martina and Sean Burke and their ten children: Ammi, Elijah, Enoch, Esther, Isaac, Jemima, Josiah, Keren, Kezia, and Simeon. A frequent subject of their protests is the LGBT community in Ireland.

Background 
Sean Burke, a qualified electrician, and his wife, Martina, a qualified schoolteacher, together operate the "Burke Christian School" and independent Evangelical church at Cloonsunna, near Castlebar in County Mayo. All ten of their children - Ammi, Elijah, Enoch, Esther, Isaac, Jemima, Josiah, Keren, Kezia, and Simeon - have names taken from the Old Testament of the Bible.

Academia 
The Burke children were all home schooled, and several hold postgraduate degrees. Isaac has a PhD in mathematics, and Kezia has won awards for a paper she wrote on mathematics and physics. Enoch also holds two bachelor's degrees (one in theological studies, the other in history and politics) as well as a master's degree in education. Josiah holds an MSc in economic history. Simeon won the Mayo School's Debating Competition alongside his brother Elijah, and represented the National University of Ireland, Galway (NUIG) at the final of The Irish Times Debating Competition in 2020. All of the siblings who have completed an undergraduate degree received a first-class honours.

Anti-LGBT activism
The Burke family have collectively expressed anti-LGBT views, including in 2008 when members of the family protested outside of Dáil Eireann with placards quoting a version of a verse from Leviticus 18 which states "Thou shalt not lie with mankind as with womankind. It is an abomination". Enoch Burke was involved in picketing outside St. James's Hospital in which he confronted passersby about links between homosexuals and HIV/AIDS. In 2014, members of the family attending NUIG distributed leaflets linking homosexuality to incest and pedophilia. During the 2015 referendum on same-sex marriage, members of the family campaigned for a "no" vote, with Isaac and Enoch becoming involved with the Mandate for Marriage campaign group. In 2017, 2018 and 2019 they protested the annual gay pride parade in Castlebar.

Opposition to gay mural (2015) 
In April 2015, Martina and Enoch Burke appeared on Joe Duffy's show Liveline, arguing that a mural depicting two men embracing should be painted over due to a lack of planning permission. The mural, by artist Joe Caslin, was located on the corner of Dame Street and George's Street. Having called in separately, they refused to answer Duffy when he questioned whether the two were related. Taking place roughly a month before the 2015 referendum on same-sex marriage, the Burkes made the case that the mural was erected illegally, and was explicitly political, as the artist, they said, had confirmed on Twitter that he had hoped to convince people to vote in favour of legalising gay marriage. Arguing against them, callers to the show made the case that a mural does not require planning permission provided it is neither commercial in nature nor involves product promotion, and that a depiction of two men in an embrace, absent any political slogans or explicit indications the pair were married, could not be explicitly taken as an endorsement of gay marriage. Callers accused Martina in particular of being disingenuous, as she stated on the show that she would not have called to complain about an illegally erected mural depicting something else.

Negative campaigning against LGBT politicians (2019) 
In 2023 it was discovered by the Irish Independent that during the 2019 European Parliament election in Ireland, Enoch Burke spent several thousand euro to purchase attack ads on Facebook targetting LGBT politicians such as Katherine Zappone and Maria Walsh. The adverts took users to websites created by Enoch Burke which negatively portrayed the politicians, with the website focusing on Katherine Zappone accusing her of being associated with witchcraft and holding anti-Christian views.

NUIG religious discrimination challenge (2014–2021) 
In 2014, Isaac, Kezia, Ammi, and Enoch were all given lifetime bans from participating in student societies at the university they attended, which was at the time called NUI Galway. That year, NUIG's students' union held a referendum about implementing a strategy of boycott, divestment, and sanctions against the state of Israel. The Burkes who together occupied all four officer positions on the university's Christian Union Society, used society funds to print leaflets advocating for a "no" vote. The university's "society co-ordination group" (USCG) stated that the siblings were banned as a result of the distribution of the leaflets which bore the college logo, which was against the college's code of conduct, and furthermore used college funds to pay for the leaflet - misrepresenting the college in the process. The university had previously received complaints from students surrounding the Burkes' distribution of leaflets which connected same-sex marriage to paedophilia and incest. Upon investigation of the production of the fliers, it was found that the siblings' brother Josiah had been reimbursed €325 for costs associated with the production of the fliers, and there was no indication that any members of the society outside of the Burke family had approved of such a use of funds. The investigation also found that Isaac had altered the society's accounts to mask the fact that the payment had been made to his brother. As a result of the investigation, on 10 November the four siblings were issued lifetime bans from participation in student societies.

The siblings first complained to the Workplace Relations Commission (WRC), where an adjudicating officer rejected their complaint. They then appealed to the Circuit Court on grounds of religious discrimination. At this point (2019), NUIG revoked their lifetime bans and offered not to seek costs against the siblings if they would revoke their claim, which the Burkes refused to do. On the first day of court, the Gardaí were called to courtroom as the Burkes, unhappy with the presiding judge and insisting on the appointment of a different judge, refused to leave the courtroom. Ruling in November 2021, Judge Raymond Groarke found that though USCG's handling of the matter constituted an “extraordinary and inexcusable” lack of knowledge of fair or proper procedures, he rejected that the flaws in the handling of the case constituted discrimination on religious grounds. One example of the flawed process by which the USCG came to bar the Burkes was that members of the investigating committee were also involved in voting on the siblings' disbarment. There were also "serious aggravating circumstances" according to Groarke: such as the lack of cooperation from the Burkes with the investigation, their efforts to hinder the investigation, their failure to truthfully deliver a summary of events, their fabrication of accounts, and their misuse of Christian Union funds.

Unlawful dismissal appeal (2019–present)
On 12 November 2019, Ammi Burke was fired from her position working with the Arthur Cox law firm. Following her dismissal, the Burke family picketed her previous place of employment. Ammi claimed that her firing amounted to unfair dismissal, and was a result of her criticizing a partner in the firm after a situation arose where she was required to work until 2 a.m. while her peers socialised. Representation for Arthur Cox disputed this, citing a breakdown in relations between Burke and three of six senior partners as the reason for her dismissal. Ammi initially complained to the Workplace Relations Commission, but after Marie Flynn, the adjudication officer hearing Ammi's case, recused herself, Ammi appealed to the High Court. The High Court judge, Garrett Simons, ruled against Ammi, finding that Flynn was correct in recusing herself from the case.

The case was then reopened by the WRC, and was presided over by Kevin Baneham. Ammi requested that Baneham recuse himself, citing that he was a Labour Party "comrade" of Arthur Cox's senior counsel. During the hearing, both Ammi and Martina Burke repeatedly spoke over other persons present, with Martina's interruptions preventing a witness from being sworn in six times over the course of several hours. The hearing was eventually thrown out as repeated interruptions and her requests for additional witnesses prevented the trial from moving forward.

Ammi then filed another appeal to the High Court, this time seeking to have the WRC's decision overruled. She claimed that Baneham's ruling was flawed and was not made in accordance with fair procedures. Four days into the appeal, which was held virtually, the judge, Marguerite Bolger, threatened to mute Ammi's microphone if she continued making sustained interruptions as she had been up to that point. Bolger refused Ammi's request for an expedited trial, and as of August 2022, the case is due to resume at a later date.

PhD delay action (2020) 
In January 2020, Isaac Burke won an action he took against NUIG regarding a delay in the scheduling of the viva exam as part of his pursuit of a PhD in mathematics. Following the submission of Isaac's thesis on 31 January 2017, his supervisor failed to organise a viva with an external examiner. A breakdown in communication with the supervisor followed. NUIG guidelines state that a viva should take place within two months of the submission of a thesis, but by July 2017, Isaac had still not been offered the opportunity to complete his examination. The court awarded Isaac €13,035 in damages. Isaac completed his PhD in 2020.

Aftermath of the death of Sally Maaz (2020–2022) 
In April 2020 Sally Maaz, a 17-year-old girl from Mayo with an underlying heart defect, died with COVID-19. A clip of Jemima Burke questioning chief medical officer Tony Holohan in May 2020 went viral on the internet. Claiming to represent a defunct newspaper, she put questions to Holohan in a "combative" manner, and her microphone was eventually cut off. 

Following Mazz's death, an inquest was arranged to determine the cause. When the inquest first opened in October 2020, despite the right of the public to access a court only 14 people were permitted in the courtroom due to restrictions in place as a result of the COVID-19 pandemic. An unidentified man and Jemima (who were there together) were asked to leave the courtroom, and Jemima was ordered to wear a face covering. Following their refusal to do so, the preliminary hearing was adjourned to a later date. At one point, Jemima, Josiah, and Martina were all forcibly removed from an inquest by Gardaí after "causing huge distress to the bereaved family while making unfounded claims about the girl’s hospital care".

Predicted grades appeal (2020) 
As a result of the effects of the COVID-19 pandemic in Ireland, it was announced in May 2020 that in place of sitting the Leaving Certificate, students would be able to avail of predicted grades, as assigned by their teachers. Students who were homeschooled or tutored by either their parents or a close relative, however, were excluded from the scheme, and so Elijah Burke was initially excluded from the scheme. Elijah launched an appeal, and in August 2020 the High Court ruled in his favour, determining that he, and other students in his position, had been unfairly excluded from the scheme. Judge Charles Meenan advised that an independent teacher be involved in determining Elijah's predicted grades, and described his initial exclusion from the scheme as "irrational, unreasonable and unlawful”. Though initially unclear whether Elijah and his fellow excluded students would be able to access their predicted grades in time for first-round offers from universities, ultimately, Minister for Education Norma Foley confirmed that they would be able to access those grades at the same date as all other students.

Simeon Burke at the University of Galway (2020–2021)

COVID-19 pledge appeal (2020) 
In September 2020, following protests led by Simeon Burke, NUIG dropped what had been a mandatory pledge that all incoming and returning students had to sign as a condition of their registration with the university. The pledge, whereby students agreed to "behave responsibly" in regard to public health advice surrounding the COVID-19 pandemic, also included provisions against bullying and harassment. Following the protests, the NUIG agreed to make the pledge voluntary instead of mandatory.

Online bullying claims (2021) 
In 2021, Simeon contested the election for the role of president of the NUIG's Students Union, having previously run for the role of Welfare and Equality Officer in 2020. Burke ran under the slogan "A president for the many not the mob", similar to his campaign slogan in 2020, "welfare of the many, not the few". The campaign is described as having become "acrimonious and personalised". Burke ran against rival Róisín Nic Lochlainn in both races, losing with 482 votes compared to Nic Lochlainn'’s 1192, and again with 104 votes compared to Nic Lochlainn's 1877 in the presidential races. On 22 February, at a Students Union council meeting, Burke repeatedly interrupted the proceedings, resulting in his microphone being muted by the chairperson. In protest, he held up a handwritten sign reading "Student Sworn At No Apology." Doctored versions of the image began circulating and became a meme, and the dean of students instructed that all tweets including doctored versions of the photo be deleted. One student named Cian refused to do so, and following his refusal and threats of disciplinary action, the hashtag #freeCian trended in Ireland on Twitter. Burke said that the hashtag amounted to sustained online abuse and intimidation, and after TD Paul Murphy retweeted Cian's original tweet, Burke complained to the clerk of the Dáil. The clerk referred it to an Oireachtas committee, who ultimately refused to investigate the matter.

Wilson's Hospital School dispute (2022–present) 

In June 2022, Enoch Burke was suspended from Wilson's Hospital School, a Church of Ireland co-educational boarding school in County Westmeath, where he was employed as a teacher, and subsequently, on 30 August, the school was granted a High Court interim injunction preventing him from either being on school grounds or teaching classes there for the duration of his suspension.

The issue arose when both the school and the parents of a transgender student who wanted to transition requested that they/them pronouns be used for the student, along with their new name. At a church service attended by staff, clergy, pupils, parents, and board members, Burke interrupted the proceedings by voicing his objections to addressing the student as "they", and objected to the school acknowledging the student's transition. He also objected to transgender identity more broadly. After a subsequent meal, Burke pursued the school's principal, repeatedly questioning her on the issue. Having told him that she would address the issue with him at a later date, she then went to walk away from him, but he followed her, continuing to press the issue, until other people present intervened. As a result of this behaviour, Burke was suspended, pending a disciplinary review. Following his suspension, however, Burke continued to arrive at school premises, leading to the school seeking the interim injunction seeking to prevent him from teaching or attending the premises.

On 1 September, it was reported that Burke had allegedly breached the injunction, and that a further court order had been sought by the school, which could result in Burke being jailed for contempt of court unless he agreed to abide by the terms of the interim injunction. Burke failed to appear at the High Court as required, on 2 September, and judge Miriam O'Regan granted an order for Burke's arrest as a result of his non-compliance with the injunction. On 5 September, Burke was arrested after arriving at the school premises in spite of the injunction. He was remanded to Mountjoy Prison for contempt of court. On a further appearance before the High Court on 7 September, Burke declined the opportunity to purge his contempt; judge Max Barrett remanded him in custody at Mountjoy Prison for a further week and awarded costs against him. Burke said that he would rather stay in prison "every hour of every day for the next 100 years" than comply. He also said that being transgender contradicts scripture and that he would "only obey God" and "not obey man".

On 4 October, it was reported that Burke had lodged an appeal at the Court of Appeal against the injunction and had sought orders including one preventing the school from continuing both his paid administrative leave and the disciplinary process against him, and another preventing the school from dismissing him from his position. On 9 October, the Irish Independent reported that Burke had been moved to a new jail cell for his own safety, after repeatedly expressing his outspoken views to other prisoners. The Irish Times subsequently reported that Burke alleged that he had been defamed in the Irish Independent article, and was seeking an order banning its republication. On 14 October, Martina Burke was removed from the courtroom after accusing the judge of corruption and colluding with the judges of the High Court. On the same day, Ammi Burke refused to apologise to the court for continually interrupting proceedings. On 13 December, appearing in court via a video link from Mountjoy Prison, Enoch Burke again refused to purge his contempt. He requested  Mr Justice Conor Dignam to release him from custody, telling the court that he was "not a thief, a murderer or a drug dealer" and was behind bars because of his religious objections to "transgenderism". The judge refused his request, as Burke was not prepared to purge his contempt or to stay away from Wilson's Hospital School until the conclusion of the disciplinary process.

On 21 December, while the school was closed for Christmas holidays, Burke was released from prison following a ruling by Judge Brian O'Moore, and was informed that he would remain at liberty unless he breached other existing orders (such as the one preventing his attendance at school while suspended). The judge said "it was difficult to avoid the conclusion that Mr Burke was exploiting his imprisonment for his own ends" and that "The only plausible interpretation of Mr Burke's actions is that he sees some advantage in his continuing imprisonment, otherwise he would have either avoided his jailing or taken the opportunity to bring it to an end." O'Moore cited the cost to the public and the desire to "not enable somebody found to be in contempt of court to garner some advantage from that defiance" as reasons to release Burke from imprisonment.

On 5 and 6 January 2023, Burke reappeared at the school. The Gardaí said "An Garda Síochána are aware of the matters as highlighted. As these matters refer to a civil order, An Garda Síochána has no role at this time."

The full disciplinary hearing into Burke's behaviour took place on 19 January at the Mullingar Park Hotel, with Gardaí being called as the meeting was disrupted by the Burke family. Burke was formally dismissed from his teaching role on 20 January. Despite the termination of his employment, Burke entered the school premises twice on 24 January, and was arrested under the Public Order Act. He returned and stood outside the school again on 25 January. 

Burke continued to reappear at the school despite his formal dismissal. Following a complaint to the Gardaí concerning alleged trespass, Burke was arrested on the school premises on 24 January, and returned to the school later that day when released without charge. A file was subsequently sent by the Gardaí to the Director of Public Prosecutions.

On 26 January, Judge O'Moore imposed a fine of €700 a day with effect from 2pm on 27 January if Burke continues to attend the school. Burke has continued to turn up outside the school on subsequent schooldays. On 10 February, Burke and his sister Ammi made an unscheduled appearance at the High Court, causing an adjournment when they refused to leave and allegedly made abusive comments to the presiding judge.

On 19 February, Fred Phelps Jr, pastor of the notoriously controversial Westboro Baptist Church in America, stated that though he supported Burke's position, he felt he had "gone too far".

On 7 March, the Court of Appeal ruled against Enoch Burke. Family members Ammi, Simeon, Isaac, Sean, Martina, and Enoch were ejected from the court by gardaí due to their disruption when the judge attempted to read the judgment. Simeon was remanded in custody for breach of the peace. He refused to take up bail (which was unopposed), meaning he missed his King's Inns law exams.

As of 16 March, fines of almost €24,000 have been imposed due to Burke's continued attendance at school premises, with Judge Brian O'Moore saying the school was "free to take whatever measures it wished to take to enforce the fines" from 23 March onwards.

References

External links 

 Burke Christian School - school operated by Sean and Martina Burke.
 Burke Broadcast— A website set up and run by Isaac Burke, documenting the challenge brought to the University of Galway by himself, Kezia, Ammi, and Enoch.
 2015 Liveline debate about a mural depicting two men in an embrace in advance of the 2015 same-sex marriage referendum in Ireland, featuring Martina and Enoch Burke.

Irish anti-same-sex-marriage activists
Irish activists
Irish evangelicals
Irish families
Living people
People from Castlebar